Sericoptera is a genus of moths in the family Geometridae erected by Gottlieb August Wilhelm Herrich-Schäffer in 1855.

Species
Sericoptera virginaria (Hulst, 1886)
Sericoptera chartaria (Guenée, 1857)
Sericoptera mahometaria (Herrich-Schäffer, [1853])
Sericoptera flavifimbria (Walker, 1860)
Sericoptera penicillata (Warren, 1894)
Sericoptera curvistriga (Warren, 1894)
Sericoptera nigricornis (Warren, 1894)

References

Ourapterygini